The 1978 WTA Tour consisted of a number of tennis tournaments for female tennis players. It was composed of the newly streamlined version of the Virginia Slims Circuit (which was now an 11-week tour of the US) and the Colgate Series. The tour was administered by the Women's International Professional Tennis Council.

Schedule
This is a calendar of all events which were part of either the Virginia Slims circuit or the Colgate Series in the year 1978, with player progression documented from the quarterfinals stage. Also included are the Grand Slam tournaments, the 1978 Virginia Slims Championships, the 1978 Federation Cup and a number of events not affiliated with either tour.

Key

November (1977)

December (1977)

January

February

March

April

May

June

July
''No tournaments this month

August

September

October

November

December

Colgate Series

Draw and seeding

Wild cards for the tournament had to be given to either local players or players who had won Wimbledon, the US Open, the Virginia Slims or Colgate Series championships or were previous winners of the tournament. All tournaments used a seeded draw with the number of seeds depending on the draw size.

Points system
The tournaments of the Colgate Series were divided into four groups – AAAA, AAA, AA and A – based on prize money. Points were allocated based on these groups and the finishing position of a player in a tournament. The points allocation – with doubles points listed in brackets – was:

Points standings and bonus pool

The total bonus pool for the Colgate Series was $675,000, an increase of $75,000 compared to the previous year, and was divided over singles ($540,000) and doubles ($135,000). The 35 highest points ranking singles players and the top 20 in doubles qualified to receive a share of the bonus pool. The distribution ranged from $100,000 for the first placed singles player to $3,000 for the 35th placed player. The first placed doubles player received $22,000 bonus while the 20th placed player received $2,000. In order to be eligible for a share of the respective bonus pools players had to a) participate in a minimum of seven singles or three doubles tournaments and b) accept invitation for the series championships if qualified based on merit. Players who ended on equal points were ranked in order of the number of tournaments played.

Virginia Slims Circuit

Points standings and prize money

Combined prize money for singles and doubles events.
The points, named 'Silver Ginny Points', were allocated as follows:
 Winner: 210 
 Runner-up: 150
 Third: 110 
 Semifinalist: 100 
 Quarterfinalist: 65 
 Round of 16: 30 
 Round of 32: 8

WTA Tour

Year-end rankings
Below are the 1978 WTA year-end rankings (December 10, 1978) in both singles and doubles competition:

Prize money leaders

See also
 1978 Men's Grand Prix circuit

Notes

References

External links
Women's Tennis Association (WTA) official website
International Tennis Federation (ITF) official website

 
WTA Tour
WTA Tour seasons